The Whole Wide World is a 1996 American independent biographical film produced and directed by Dan Ireland in his directorial debut. It depicts the relationship between pulp fiction writer Robert E. Howard (Vincent D'Onofrio) and schoolteacher Novalyne Price Ellis (Renée Zellweger).

The film was adapted by Michael Scott Myers from Ellis's memoir One Who Walked Alone.

Premise
In 1933 Texas school teacher and aspiring writer Novalyne Price is introduced by friends to pulp fiction writer Robert E. Howard.  A relationship soon develops between the two but it is doomed by personality conflicts and life events, such as the terminal illness of Howard's mother.

Cast
Vincent D'Onofrio as Robert E. 'Bob' Howard
Renée Zellweger as Novalyne Price
Libby Villari as Etna Reed Price, Novalyne's mother 
Ann Wedgeworth as Mrs. Howard
Harve Presnell as Dr. Howard
Benjamin Mouton as Clyde Smith
Michael Corbett as Mayor Booth Adams
Helen Cates as Enid

Cast notes
Olivia d'Abo was intended for the role of Novalyne Price but was pregnant when shooting began.

Soundtrack
Original music was provided by Harry Gregson-Williams and his mentor Hans Zimmer. This was their first collaboration as mentor and protégé.

Legacy
When auditioning for the film Jerry Maguire, Zellweger met director Cameron Crowe several times but had trouble convincing him that she could play "a 20-something woman" rather than a girl. This was solved by Zellweger's agent sending Crowe a tape of The Whole Wide World.

Awards and honors
Nominated
Grand Jury Prize at the 1996 Sundance Film Festival
Best Female Lead for Renée Zellweger at the 1997 Independent Spirit Awards
Best First Screenplay for Michael Scott Myers at the 1997 Independent Spirit Awards
Best Film at the 1996 Verona Love Screens Film Festival

Won
American Independent Special Jury Prize at the 1996 Seattle International Film Festival
Best Actor for Vincent D'Onofrio (Golden Space Needle Award) at the 1996 Seattle International Film Festival
Best Actress for Renée Zellweger at the 1996 Mar del Plata Film Festival
Best Actor for Vincent D'Onofrio at the 1998 Lone Star Film & Television Awards
Best Screenplay for Michael Scott Myers at the 1998 Lone Star Film & Television Awards
Best Cinematography for Claudio Rocha at the 1996 Ft Lauderdale International Film Festival

References

External links

The Whole Wide World at Barbarian Keep (Robert E. Howard site)

1996 films
1996 directorial debut films
1996 independent films
1990s biographical films
American biographical films
American independent films
1990s English-language films
Films directed by Dan Ireland
Films scored by Harry Gregson-Williams
Biographical films about educators
Biographical films about writers
Films based on biographies
Films set in 1933
Films set in Texas
Films shot in Texas
Works about Robert E. Howard
Sony Pictures Classics films
The Kushner-Locke Company films
1990s American films
Films set in the 1930s